André Darrieussecq (4 June 1947 – 31 July 2020) was a French rugby union player who played in the prop position.

Biography
Darrieussecq began his career with his hometown team, Saint-Jean-de-Luz Olympique. From 1968 to 1977, he played with Biarritz Olympique. He was also selected for the French national team during the 1973 Six Nations Championship. He played one game on 24 February 1973 against England.

André Darrieussecq died on 31 July 2020 at the age of 93.

References

1947 births
2020 deaths
French rugby union players
Rugby union props